Yukarıçarıkçı is a village in the District of Iğdır, Iğdır Province, in eastern Turkey. In 2019 it had a population of 742.

Geography
The village lies to the east of Tuzluca,  by road west of the district capital of Iğdır.

References

Villages in Iğdır Province